Mateus de Oliveira Silva (born 27 September 1994) is a Brazilian football midfielder who plays for FK Humenné, on loan from FK Pohronie.

Club career

FC ViOn Zlaté Moravce - Vráble
Mateus Oliveira made his professional Fortuna Liga debut for ViOn Zlaté Moravce against Senica on 19 November 2016. He also netted his first goal for Zlaté Moravce in the match against Senica.

References

External links
 Fortuna Liga profile
 
 Futbalnet profile
 Mateus Oliveira at ZeroZero

1994 births
Living people
Brazilian footballers
Brazilian expatriate footballers
Association football midfielders
FC ViOn Zlaté Moravce players
Slovak Super Liga players
CD San Fernando de Henares players
ŠKF Sereď players
FK Pohronie players
FK Humenné players
Footballers from São Paulo
Expatriate footballers in Slovakia
Brazilian expatriate sportspeople in Slovakia
Expatriate footballers in Spain
Brazilian expatriate sportspeople in Spain